Professor Edward Travers, played by Jack Watling, is a fictional anthropologist and explorer who appears in two serials of the BBC television series Doctor Who and a spin-off TV movie.

Character history

Professor Travers first appears in The Abominable Snowmen tracking Yeti in Tibet. His companion is killed and Travers flees his camp after seeing a creature standing over his friend's body. He seeks refuge in the Detsen Monastery where he meets the Doctor later whom he initially suspects of being responsible for his friend's death and takes to be a sabotaging journalist.

After meeting the Doctor's companions Jamie and Victoria, Travers is convinced of the Doctor's innocence. Upon the discovery of killer, robotic Yeti, Travers fears for the real Yeti but is temporarily suspected of controlling the robotic Yeti himself. Travers assists the Doctor in defeating the Great Intelligence, the true controllers of the robotic Yeti. He pursues what he believes to be a real Yeti after glimpsing it as the Doctor and his companions depart.

Professor Travers reappears in The Web of Fear. A robotic Yeti he brought back from Tibet is being exhibited in a museum in England. A Yeti control sphere that the Professor has reactivated is missing and he believes the Yeti now poses a threat. He summons his daughter, Anne, back from America and tries to persuade the museum owner, Julius Silverstein, to part with his exhibit. Silverstein refuses, even turning down the Professor's offer of money. However the sphere re-activates the Yeti.

At his daughter's request, Professor Travers becomes attached to the military to aid them in solving the London crisis – a mysterious, spreading web that is engulfing the city. Later, the Professor is reunited with Jamie and Victoria at the military's headquarters set up in the London Underground, but is puzzled as to why they have not aged significantly in the time between their meetings. Travers persuades the military to find the Doctor who has been separated from his companions.

The Professor is captured by robotic Yeti and becomes a conduit for the voice of the Great Intelligence that takes control of his body. After using him to capture Victoria, the Great Intelligence surrenders its control of Professor Travers. He is reunited with the Doctor and once more assists him in defeating the Great Intelligence.

In The Invasion, the Doctor, Jamie and Zoe seek out Professor Travers after landing in late twentieth-century London to help them fix the TARDIS's damaged visual stabiliser. However, Professor Travers has left for America, leaving his house in the care of Professor Watkins and his niece, Isobel Watkins.

Behind the scenes

Professor Travers actor Jack Watling is the real life father of his Doctor Who co-star Deborah Watling, who played Victoria. Professor Travers was originally to make a third appearance in The Invasion but was replaced by the character of Professor Watkins owing to Jack Watling's unavailability for filming and the limited screen time the character would have featured in that story.

Appearances
The Abominable Snowmen — 30 September  – 4 November 1967
The Web of Fear — 3 February – 9 March 1968

Other appearances

Jack Watling reprised the role of Professor Travers for the Reeltime Pictures direct-to-video production Downtime in 1995, a Doctor Who spin-off. In Downtime, Travers's mind is still possessed by the Great Intelligence and it reanimates his dead body. He is instated as the Chancellor of New World University as the Great Intelligence prepares to conquer the Earth. Brigadier Lethbridge-Stewart, Sarah Jane Smith and Daniel Hinton collaborate to defeat the Great Intelligence and their robotic Yeti. When the Great Intelligence is defeated, Travers's body dissolves.

Downtime was novelised as a Missing Adventure. Professor Travers also appears in numerous Lethbridge-Stewart novels and short stories, published by Candy Jar Books. (https://www.lethbridge-stewart.co.uk/characters/)

References

Recurring characters in Doctor Who
Television characters introduced in 1967
Fictional professors
Fictional anthropologists
Fictional explorers
Male characters in television